Azna County is in Lorestan province, Iran. The capital of the county is the city of Azna. At the 2006 census, the county's population was 70,462 in 16,663 households. The following census in 2011 counted 71,586 people in 19,843 households. At the 2016 census, the county's population was 74,936 in 22,411 households.

Administrative divisions

The population history of Azna County's administrative divisions over three consecutive censuses is shown in the following table. The latest census shows two districts, four rural districts, and two cities.

References

 

Counties of Lorestan Province